Anna Lisbet Kristina Rausing (born 9 June 1960) is a science historian and philanthropist. She is a co-founder of Arcadia, one of the UK's largest philanthropic foundations.

Early life
Lisbet Rausing is the eldest daughter of Hans Rausing and his wife Märit Rausing. She has one sister, Sigrid Rausing, and one brother, Hans Kristian Rausing.  Her grandfather, Ruben Rausing, was co-founder of the Swedish packaging company Tetra Pak.

Rausing studied History at the University of California, Berkeley (B.A., summa cum laude 1984) and completed an M.A. (1987) and Ph.D. (1993) in History at Harvard University.

Career
Harvard University Press published Rausing's scholarly biography of Carl Linnaeus, Linnaeus: Nature and Nation in 1999. Throughout her career she has published a range of articles on related subjects in scholarly journals including Isis, Representations, Configurations, and History of Political Economy.  She has also contributed to the Financial Times and The Sunday Telegraph, and has published a number of pieces on the evolution of archive digitization and on open access to scholarship.

Rausing is a senior research fellow at King's College.  She holds honorary doctorates from Uppsala University  and SOAS.  She is also an honorary fellow of the British Academy, the Linnean Society, the Royal Historical Society, The Royal Society of Biology and the Royal Swedish Academy of Agriculture and Forestry. She was elected to the Harvard Board of Overseers (2005–2011) and Yad Hanadiv Advisory Committee (2001–2011). She served on the Cambridge Conservation Initiative Advisory Board from 2012 to 2022. She also works closely with a family-owned liquid food packaging company, Ecolean.

Philanthropy

Lisbet Rausing co-founded the Arcadia Fund in 2001 with her husband Professor Peter Baldwin. As of March 2022, the Fund has made grant commitments of over $919 million to charities and scholarly institutions globally that preserve cultural heritage and the environment and promote open access. Arcadia-funded projects include the Endangered Languages Documentation Programme at Berlin Brandenburg Academy of Sciences and Humanities, the Endangered Archives Programme at the British Library and Fauna & Flora International's Halcyon Land and Sea fund. They are listed as one of the biggest benefactors to the Wikimedia Foundation and donated $5 million to the Wikimedia endowment in 2017 after Baldwin joined its advisory board.

Rausing and Baldwin also founded Lund Trust. Since 2002 Lund Trust has given more than $77.7 million to charities in the UK and internationally.

See also
 Rausing family

References

External links

Arcadia Fund
Biography at Imperial College
Harvard University Press

1960 births
Living people
English people of Swedish descent
Historians of science
Swedish philanthropists
Lisbet
Harvard University alumni
Fellows of the Royal Society of Biology
University of California, Berkeley alumni
Honorary Fellows of the British Academy